The Iranian Volleyball Super League 2018–19 was the 32nd season of the Iranian Volleyball Super League, the highest professional volleyball league in Iran. The season started on 10 October 2018 and ended on 18 March 2019.

Regular season

Standings

Results

Playoffs
All times are Iran Standard Time (UTC+03:30).
All series were the best-of-three format, except for the single-match 3rd place playoff.

Quarterfinals
Shahrdari Varamin vs. Shahrdari Gonbad

Foolad Sirjan Iranian vs. Payam Mashhad

Paykan Tehran vs. Saipa Tehran

Khatam Ardakan vs. Kalleh Mazandaran

Semifinals
Shahrdari Varamin vs. Payam Mashhad

Saipa Tehran vs. Kalleh Mazandaran

3rd place
Venue: Azadi Indoor Stadium, Tehran

Payam Mashhad vs. Kalleh Mazandaran

The 3rd place playoff between Payam Mashhad and Kalleh Mazandaran, initially scheduled for 16 March, was canceled by mutual agreement. The two teams shared the 3rd place.

Final
Venue: Azadi Indoor Stadium, Tehran

Shahrdari Varamin vs. Saipa Tehran

Final standings

References

External links
Iran Volleyball Federation

League 2018-19
Iran Super League, 2018-19
Iran Super League, 2018-19
Volleyball League, 2018-19
Volleyball League, 2018-19